Lennox Stanislaus Kilgour (May 5, 1927 – 2004) was a weightlifter from Trinidad and Tobago. He became West Indian champion in 1949, Central American champion in 1950, and won a bronze medal at the 1952 Summer Olympics in Helsinki. He did not compete at world championships because they were held in Europe in those years, and the Trinidad and Tobago Weightlifting Association had insufficient finances to cover traveling costs.

References

External links

1927 births
2004 deaths
Trinidad and Tobago male weightlifters
Olympic weightlifters of Trinidad and Tobago
Weightlifters at the 1952 Summer Olympics
Weightlifters at the 1956 Summer Olympics
Olympic bronze medalists for Trinidad and Tobago
Olympic medalists in weightlifting
Weightlifters at the 1954 British Empire and Commonwealth Games
Commonwealth Games silver medallists for Trinidad and Tobago
Pan American Games silver medalists for Trinidad and Tobago
Medalists at the 1952 Summer Olympics
Commonwealth Games medallists in weightlifting
Pan American Games medalists in weightlifting
Weightlifters at the 1951 Pan American Games
Medalists at the 1951 Pan American Games
Medallists at the 1954 British Empire and Commonwealth Games